Lars Jacobsson may refer to:

 Lars Jacobsson (Swedish football manager and former player)
 Lars Valentin Jacobsson (Swedish entrepreneur, inventor, philanthropist, social entrepreneur and conservationist)